Salybia or Salibia is a hamlet on the east coast of Dominica in Saint David Parish.  It is located to the south of Pagua Bay and north of the town of Castle Bruce.  It is the main commercial and administrative center for the Carib Territory, the only indigenous people's reserve in the Caribbean.

The Salybia Mission Project, a nonprofit organization led by Ross University School of Medicine medical students, provides free medical services in the surrounding area.

References

Carib people
Indigenous peoples in Dominica
Lands inhabited by indigenous peoples
Populated places in Dominica

Salybia is a song from the Trinidadian rock band Cabezon.